Vachik Yeghiazaryan (born 1 May 1991) is an Armenian Greco-Roman wrestler.

He became a Champion of Armenia in 2010. Yeghiazaryan won a bronze medal at the 2013 European Wrestling Championships in Tbilisi.

References

1991 births
Living people
Sportspeople from Yerevan
Armenian male sport wrestlers
European Wrestling Championships medalists
21st-century Armenian people